Icon is a compilation album by American country music artist Billy Currington. It was released on March 22, 2011. It is part of a series of similar Icon albums released by Universal Music Enterprises. The album includes Currington's first nine singles, four of which reached number one, as well as album tracks "Swimmin' in Sunshine" and "She's Got a Way with Me."

Track listing

Critical reception

Thom Jurek of AllMusic notes that the album is "for those who came late to the party […] or are simply looking for a prime Billy Currington playlist."

Chart performance
Icon debuted at number 22 on the U.S. Billboard Top Country Albums chart and number 104 on the Billboard 200.

Charts

Weekly charts

Year-end charts

References

2011 compilation albums
Billy Currington albums
Mercury Records compilation albums